Heighe House is a historic home complex and national historic district at Bel Air, Harford County, Maryland, United States. The complex consists of a Colonial Revival, -story stone main house built on and incorporating the stone foundations of the Moores Mill, built in 1745; a -story frame chauffeur's cottage; garage; and a -story stone and frame guest house. They are all located on a steeply sloping  site along Bynum Run.  The property was developed in 1928 as a country estate for Anne McElderry Heighe (d. 1953), a woman widely regarded as the "first lady of Maryland racing."

It was added to the National Register of Historic Places in 1990.

References

External links
, including photo dated 1990, at Maryland Historical Trust

Houses in Bel Air, Harford County, Maryland
Houses on the National Register of Historic Places in Maryland
Historic districts on the National Register of Historic Places in Maryland
National Register of Historic Places in Harford County, Maryland